Cramlington Learning Village, formerly Cramlington Community High School, is a large high school with academy status in Cramlington, Northumberland, England; it is a comprehensive school of around 2100 students.

The school became an 11–18 school in September 2008 as part of a local authority reorganisation of education in the town which saw the former three-tier system, of first, middle and high schools, become a two-tier system of primary and secondary schools. The school takes students aged 11 to 18 years, the latter two school years in the Sixth Form.

History
The school was established in 1969 as Cramlington County High School, after the upgrading of Cramlington to a new town under the New Towns Act 1946. In line with Northumberland Local Education Authority's other high schools, the name was changed to Cramlington Community High School in the early 1990s as part of a scheme that enabled wider community use of the schools. Though a second high school was originally planned, as of 2022, it remains the only secondary school in the town.

Former head teachers include Peter Dines CBE, later the Chief Executive of the Schools Council from 1988 to 1993 and the National Curriculum Council, Angus Taylor OBE and Derek Wise CBE (born 6 June 1949). Wise, head from 1990 until 2010, led a turnaround in the school's performance and began to implement the process of "Accelerated Learning" in 1997. By 2004, it was performing significantly above local authority and national averages on all key measures.

For a number of years, the school used the tagline "where the science of learning meets the art of teaching". Wise, along with former deputy headteacher Mark Lovatt, wrote Creating an Accelerated Learning School, a book explaining their implementation of accelerated learning techniques.

Wendy Heslop succeeded Wise as headteacher. Upon her retirement in 2021, she had worked at the school for 35 years. John Bird and Kim Irving were then appointed Co-Heads.

It had Science College status and was later awarded a second specialism in vocational education. In 2003, it was selected as one of the nation's Leading Edge schools by the office of Public Service Reform (Cabinet Office).

Campus and buildings

The school is divided into separate "villages":

 the Junior Learning Village – years 7 and 8
 the Senior Learning Village – years 9 to 11
 and the Advanced Learning Village – years 12 and 13 (Sixth Form).

The original buildings were constructed in 1969, consisting of a tin-plastic mixture, using the Consortium of Local Authorities Special Programme building system. A number of additional buildings have been added over the years, and the originals blocks were reclad in the 1990s.

The main buildings now include two 'blocks', Inspire and Innovate, with classrooms focussing on English, Maths, Science and Languages, 'Imagine' (a design, craft, food and ICT block), two dining halls attached to Inspire and Innovate (known as Inspire Cafe and Innovate Cafe respectively), 'Investigate' focussing on Humanities, the 'Learning Plaza', which is a mixture of a social area frequented by Years 9 to 11 (formerly the Social Block) equipped with computers, conferencing facilities. Additionally there is an Applied Learning Centre (formerly Music and Drama) where subjects such as construction and computer science are taught.

More recent additions to the school's architecture include the Advanced Learning Village (formerly Sixth Form Centre), built in 1996 to house A-Level students. It features a large seating area, small café and the Independent Learning Centre, a room for self-study with computers. There are also two small classrooms for Sixth Form specific subjects such as sociology, psychology and politics.

The Sporting Club, opened 12 February 2002, is another later addition to the site. Owned by Northumberland County Council and used by students for physical education, it houses a fitness suite, dance studio and tennis courts. There are also several fields (for football, rugby and cricket), a student-built cricket pavilion, and Astroturf suitable for play even during wet weather. There are also several large halls in other buildings suitable for indoor sports.

The most recent addition, completed in the summer of 2008, is the Junior Learning Village. The centre contains resources for teaching Years 7 and 8 after the council reforms of 11 September 2001 which moved the education system in Northumberland to the two-tier system after decades of using the three-tier system. Also contained within are resources for music and performing arts. The building is made up of other isolated 'blocks' called Enquire, Explore, Discover, Create, Communicate and Care. Other features of the JLV include its "Village" street, open science Learning Plaza, Knowledge Café, Pasta King and flexible learning spaces.

The school also uses a three-dimensional screen across the curriculum and the 'Biome' which was the result of a successful bid through the "Faraday" project designed to take the teaching of science into the 21st century. The building also has a multipurpose space called 'The Hub' which is used for assemblies, conferences, socialising at lunchtimes and hosting live shows and performances for music and drama/performing arts.

In July 2022, it was announced that the school had been selected as one of those to be rebuilt as part of the Department for Education's School Rebuilding Programme, though the extent of the development was yet to be decided.

Facilities

Technology 
The school is technology rich and has over 1500 PCs on site, with at least some in every classroom. Classrooms are also equipped with a teacher's PC, projector, interactive whiteboard and speakers. The school has its own monthly payment scheme for the provision of mobile devices to students. Initially, a Samsung Galaxy tablet was offered. From September 2014 onwards, the scheme provided Chromebooks for Year 7s, before being opened to all year groups the following year.

In the late 1990s, the school began to develop its own Intranet, initially hosted subject-specific pages, but later also hosting online lesson plans for staff and student access. It has since implemented a Frog VLE (Virtual learning environment), offering access to timetables, attendance and punctuality, home learning facilities, school notices, a cashless catering provision and reward system. Parents are provided with their own access to the portal with specific information for their child.

'The Hub', a fully functional music venue, features a sound and lighting control systems and a 3D projection installation.

Further facilities include a recording studio, with two live rooms, and a TV studio, with green screen for chroma key. The studios have the capability to broadcast live across the school campus.

Ofsted
Most recently, the school was judged to be Good in an inspection published in May 2022.

It had previously been rated Good in an inspection published in February 2017. Having previously been rated Outstanding in four successive Ofsted ratings up until 2013, an inspection in July 2015, however, found the school to be Inadequate and placed it in Special Measures. The review proved controversial, being featured on the local television news on the evening of the report's publication. A monitoring inspection, the report of which was published in October 2016, removed the Special Measures status, allowing the school to once again recruit newly qualified teachers.

Foreign exchange visits

  – The school has a biennial exchange to Bettendorf, Iowa with Bettendorf High School.
  – In 2008, the school undertook a cultural and linguistical exchange with Polyvalente Hyacinthe-Delorme in Saint-Hyacinthe, Quebec, Canada
  – Yearly exchange with an unknown school in Levante, Spain. Students swap places with other students.

Shows and productions

 High School Musical – March 2008
 Return to the Forbidden Planet – March 2009
 Joseph and the Amazing Technicolor Dreamcoat – March 2011
 We Will Rock You – March 2012
 CLV Christmas Spectacular – December 2012
 The Wizard of Oz – March 2013
 More Than Soulful Christmas – December 2013
 Our House – March 2014
 Now That's What I Call... CLV Xmas! – December 2014
 Footloose – March 2015
 Grease – March 2016
 A Disney Christmas – December 2016
 The Sound of Music – March 2017
 Billy Elliot – March 2018

Notable alumni

Ross Noble, stand-up comedian and actor. Voted the 10th-greatest stand-up comic on Channel 4's 100 Greatest Stand-Ups 
Mark Clattenburg, football referee who refereed the 2016 UEFA Champions League Final and UEFA Euro 2016 Final
Graeme Owens, former footballer who played for Middlesbrough
James Brown, former footballer with Hartlepool United
Stephen Miller, gold medal-winning British paralympics athlete
Martin Brittain, former Newcastle United footballer
Martin Taylor, footballer who played in the Premier League for Blackburn Rovers and Birmingham City
Alex Nicholson, footballer who plays for Gateshead

References

External links
 Cramlington Learning Village website

Educational institutions established in 1969
Academies in Northumberland
1969 establishments in England
Secondary schools in Northumberland
Cramlington